MYK may refer to:

Underwater Demolition Command, the Greek elite underwater demolition squad
MYK (musician), aka Michael Kim, associated with Epik High